The Ceylon Championships later known as the Sri Lankan Championships (1972–76) was a men's and women's national tennis tournament held at the Hill Club Tennis Club, Nuwara Eliya British Ceylon now Sri Lanka from 1884 through 1976.

History
The Ceylon Championships were founded in 1884 and staged at the Hill Club Tennis Club, Nuwara Eliya, British Ceylon now known as Sri Lanka the event later became known as the Sri Lanka Open which was not staged until 1976. The tournaments first three editions were men's  only events. In 1887 the first women's singles event was held that was won by Miss Isa Watson. The most successful men's player in singles was Edward De Fonblanque who won a record ten championship titles and the most successful ladies player in singles was Doreen Sansoni who won a record seven championship titles. The event was reestablished as the Sri Lanka Open in 2007. The event was sometimes staged on either  grass courts or clay courts.

References

Clay court tennis tournaments
Grass court tennis tournaments
Defunct tennis tournaments in Sri Lanka